Ahmad Satomi (born 21 February 1981) is a member of Nigeria's 9th House of Representatives. He was elected as member of House of Representatives in 2019 to represent Jere Federal Constituency.

Education 
Satomi has a BEng in Civil and Water Resources Engineering. He also furthered his education and acquired a Master's degree in Highway and Transportation Engineering.

Career 
He previously served as the chairman of State Emergency Management Agency and head of Borno State Road Maintenance Agency.

References 

Members of the House of Representatives (Nigeria)
Living people
People from Borno State
1981 births